Privateer Holdings is an American private equity company that invests in the legal cannabis industry. Privateer Holdings is headquartered in Seattle, Washington and employs more than 350 people in seven countries. The company is  building a diversified portfolio of cannabis brands. , the company has raised $122 million. Privateer Holdings secured the first institutional investor to enter the cannabis industry, Founders Fund.
In 2019 Privateer Holdings was merged with Tilray.

Portfolio companies
Privateer Holdings portfolio companies include Leafly, the world's largest cannabis information resource, Tilray Inc., a federally licensed, GMP-certified medical cannabis producer located in Nanaimo, British Columbia, and Marley Natural, a partnership with the Bob Marley estate launching a line of cannabis strains, body care products, smoking accessories, and other lifestyle goods. It is owned by Brandan Kennedy, Michael Blue, and Chris Groh.

Privateer Holdings acquired Leafly in 2011. Leafly is the largest cannabis website in the world, with more than 11 million unique visitors per month. In 2014, Leafly became the first cannabis company to place an advertisement in the New York Times.

Privateer owns 76 percent of Tilray Inc., a company federally licensed by the Government of Canada to produce, process, package and distribute medical cannabis. The company operates a 60,000 sq. ft medical cannabis research and production facility in Nanaimo, British Columbia. , Tilray supplies pharmaceutical-grade medical cannabis products. Tilray's primary market is Canada, where it serves more than 20,000 patients, but the company also exports medical cannabis products to other countries. Tilray was the first company to legally export medical cannabis products from North America to Australia, Brazil, Chile, the European Union, and New Zealand.

Tilray became the first medical cannabis producer in North America to be GMP certified in December 2016. GMP certification is the most rigorous standard that manufacturers of medical products must meet in their production processes. GMP certification allows Tilray to create products for clinical research. , Tilray supplies pharmaceutical-grade medical cannabis products for three different clinical trials in partnership with hospitals and universities in Canada and Australia.

In November 2014, Privateer Holdings and Bob Marley's daughter Cedella launched the cannabis brand Marley Natural developed by the Marley family in conjunction with Privateer. Marley Natural launched its inaugural collection of cannabis products, body care, and smoking accessories in Los Angeles, California in February 2016. , the brand sells cannabis in California, Oregon, and Washington.

References

External links

 Privateer Holdings official site

Financial services companies established in 2011
2011 in cannabis
Cannabis companies of the United States
Cannabis in Washington (state)
Cannabis law reform in the United States
Companies based in Seattle
Medicinal use of cannabis
Private equity firms of the United States